Starlight is a village in Buckingham Township, Wayne County, Pennsylvania, United States. Crosstown Highway, which is entirely concurrent with Pennsylvania Route 370 (PA-370), is generally thought to be the southern edge of the village. It was once a depot of the Scranton Division of the New York, Ontario & Western (O&W) Railway, but today, when it is known outside its immediate vicinity, it is largely for being home to the Inn at Starlight Lake & Restaurant, which has been open since 1909.

Municipal status and boundaries

A Pennsylvania Department of Transportation (PennDOT) sign on Crosstown Highway identifies the community as the "Village of Starlight." In Pennsylvania, a village is an unincorporated community within a township, but PennDOT identifies most villages with roadside signs, a fact that might reasonably lead those unfamiliar with this practice to believe that these communities are incorporated municipalities administered separately from the townships in which they are located. Since Pennsylvania's villages, including Starlight, are, in fact, not municipalities in their own right, they do not have official boundaries, and the United States Census Bureau does not collect statistics for them (unless, unlike Starlight, they are census-designated places). In spite of this, because of strong local consensus, as well as the fact that many features are named for the villages they are associated with, it is almost always impossible to consistently determine whether a particular feature is in one village or another.

Natural features
Shehawken Creek (once called Chehocton Creek) and Starlight Lake are located in Starlight. The latter is the source of the former.

Hauntings 

Ever since Starlight has been settled, there have been reports of unusual sightings, hauntings and paranormal disturbances.

Frequently, there are reports of a young woman wearing a soaking-wet evening dress. Reports say the girl tells people she was involved in a boating accident and needs to get to an address on Depot Hill Road.  When she gets into the car's back seat, she disappears.  This report has been heard since settlers were arriving in the days before automobiles, and the young woman would disappear from the back of a horse and buggy.

Another haunting includes the proprietor of a long since burned hotel that once stood on the shores of the lake.  People would flock to the lake to get away from the heat of the New York City summer and reports state that a man dressed in 19th century clothing, floating along the shore, hearing his laughter echoing over the waves.  They say the best time to hear his cackles is just before the sun goes down.

In 1890, on what was the old Cottage Road bridge, a drifter was murdered because his landlord thought the drifter was a warlock who had placed a hex upon him.  It was a particularly gruesome murder and after it was done, the drifter's body was thrown in Shehawken Creek where it floated to the middle of the lake, froze deep in the winter ice, and could not be removed until the following spring.  It is said that the hex is activated any time someone does or says things 3 times in a row. Reports continue to this day that the drifter's body can be seen in the lake from the bridge and after uttering the same phrase three times.

In the mid 1800s, the surrounding property was a successful poultry farm.  The owner's daughter was engaged to a Frenchman who owned a large plantation in Haiti and who was rumored to be a high priest in the Voodoo religion. One evening during a new moon, when the girl's father and her fiancée discussed the wedding ceremony, the Frenchman described some of the religious rituals he wanted to include in the wedding ceremony, including live chicken sacrifices, the father erupted and told the Frenchman to get out and that the wedding was off.  This disturbed the girl so much that she immediately ran out of the house in the pitch black, got on her trusted horse and took off.  In the darkness of the new moon, she didn't see a low hanging branch of a familiar tree near the lake, and was knocked off the horse and immediately killed. Her mangled body was found the next day by her father and the horse was never recovered.  The Frenchman is said to have cursed the father and it is often reported that the mangled girl can be seen in her nightgown wandering near the lake in the week following the new moon. Occasionally, there are reports of a lone horse walking in the distance along Starlight Lake Road.

References

Pocono Mountains
Unincorporated communities in Wayne County, Pennsylvania
Unincorporated communities in Pennsylvania